China Merchants Bank (CMB) is a Chinese bank headquartered in Futian District, Shenzhen, Guangdong, China. Founded in 1987, it is the first share-holding commercial bank wholly owned by corporate legal entities in China.

CMB has over five hundred branches in mainland China and one in Hong Kong. In November 2007, as part of a drive for international growth, it won federal approval to open a branch in New York City.

Business areas 
CMB operates the following businesses:

Personal Banking Business, including personal savings, personal loans, foreign exchange and  stock trading, gold trading and bank card services, among others.

Corporate & Investment Banking Business, including corporate savings, corporate loans, international settlements, trade financing, assets custody, M&A advisory, FX, fixed income, syndication among others.

As of December 31, 2008, the Bank had 44 branches and 623 sub-branches, one representative, one credit card center, one credit loan center for small companies, as well as 1,567 self-service banks in China.

Headquarters 
The China Merchants Bank Headquarters are located in Shenzhen, China. Part of the modernization and development of the city in the early 2000s. Architects, Lee/Timchula architects also designed the central city plan for Shenzhen and the focal building, the Shenzhen Citizen's Center.

References

External links 

 China Merchants Bank Company Limited official website
 Harvard Business School case study 'China Merchants Bank: Here Just For You'
 Harvard Business School case study 'China Merchants Bank in Transition'
 Harvard Business School case study 'China Merchants Bank: Business Model Transformation'
 Company profile on Sogou Baike

Companies listed on the Shanghai Stock Exchange
Companies in the CSI 100 Index
Companies listed on the Hong Kong Stock Exchange
Banks established in 1987
Banks of China
Government-owned companies of China
H shares
Companies based in Shenzhen
Chinese brands
China Merchants